Blastocera is a genus of flies in the family Stratiomyidae.

Species
Blastocera speciosa Gerstaecker, 1857

References

Stratiomyidae
Brachycera genera
Taxa named by Carl Eduard Adolph Gerstaecker
Diptera of South America